The Downs School may refer to the following schools in England:

The Downs School, Compton, a comprehensive school in Compton, Berkshire
The Downs Malvern, prep school in Colwall, Herefordshire
Downs Preparatory School, a preparatory school in Bristol
The Downs Secondary Modern, latterly the Leigh City Technology College, Dartford, Kent